Inositol polyphosphate 5-phosphatase OCRL-1, also known as Lowe oculocerebrorenal syndrome protein, is an enzyme encoded by the OCRL gene located on the X chromosome in humans.

This gene encodes an inositol polyphosphate 5-phosphatase.  The responsible gene locus is at Xq26.1. This phosphatase enzyme is in part responsible for regulating membrane trafficking actin polymerization, and is located in several subcellular parts of the trans-Golgi network.

Deficiencies in OCRL-1 may cause with oculocerebrorenal syndrome and also have been linked to Dent's disease.

References

Further reading

External links
  GeneReviews/NCBI/NIH/UW entry on Lowe Syndrome
 
 PDBe-KB provides an overview of all the structure information available in the PDB for Human Inositol polyphosphate 5-phosphatase OCRL-1